Davids Island may refer to:

 Davids Island (New York), United States
 Davids Island (Nunavut), Canada

See also
 Davis Island (disambiguation), several places
 David Island, Antarctica